Meraux is a census-designated place (CDP) in St. Bernard Parish, Louisiana, United States. The population was 6,804 in 2020. It is part of the New Orleans–Metairie–Kenner Metropolitan Statistical Area.

History
In 2005, the town was devastated by storm surge and wind associated with Hurricane Katrina which destroyed the Mississippi River-Gulf Outlet Canal (MRGO) levee.

Geography
Meraux is located at  (29.927561, -89.918508).
According to the United States Census Bureau, the CDP has a total area of 4.8 square miles (12.4 km), of which 4.2 square miles (10.8 km) is land and 0.6 square mile (1.6 km) (12.94%) is water.

Demographics

In 2000, there were 10,192 people, 3,707 households, and 2,772 families residing in the CDP. The racial makeup of the CDP was 92.71% White, 3.66% African American, 0.47% Native American, 1.63% Asian, 0.33% from other races, and 1.20% from two or more races. Hispanic or Latino of any race were 4.07% of the population. At the 2020 United States census, there were 6,804 people, 2,184 households, and 1,632 families residing in the CDP. The racial makeup was 65.06% non-Hispanic white, 14.77% Black or African American, 0.59% Native American, 2.23% Asian, 4.53% mixed or other race, and 12.82% Hispanic or Latino of any race.

Education
Residents are zoned to schools in the St. Bernard Parish Public Schools.

As of 2007, Chalmette High School serves the population.

References

External links

Census-designated places in St. Bernard Parish, Louisiana
Census-designated places in Louisiana
Census-designated places in New Orleans metropolitan area
Louisiana populated places on the Mississippi River